Gewerblicher Rechtsschutz und Urheberrecht is a monthly intellectual property law journal published in German. It is the journal of the German Association for the Protection of Intellectual Property (German: Deutsche Vereinigung für gewerblichen Rechtsschutz und Urheberrecht) and was established in 1899. The journal articles mainly concern German law. It is the journal with the longest tradition in the field of intellectual property law in Germany. Because of the green cover of the journal, the whole area of intellectual property law is commonly referred to as "green section" ("grüner Bereich") among German lawyers.

See also 
 List of intellectual property law journals
 GRUR International
 Gewerblicher Rechtsschutz und Urheberrecht, Rechtsprechungs-Report

References

External links 
  

German-language journals
German law journals
Intellectual property law journals
Publications established in 1899
Monthly journals
German intellectual property law